Lukáš Komárek (born April 29, 1982) is a Slovak former professional ice hockey defenceman.

Komárek played 216 games for HK 36 Skalica of the Slovak Extraliga between 2000 and 2006. He then signed for the Cardiff Devils of the Elite Ice Hockey League for the 2006–07 EIHL season winning the British Knockout Cup with the team.

References

External links

1982 births
Living people
Cardiff Devils players
SHK Hodonín players
HK 91 Senica players
Sportspeople from Skalica
HK 36 Skalica players
Slovak ice hockey defencemen
Slovak expatriate sportspeople in Wales
Slovak expatriate ice hockey players in the Czech Republic
Expatriate ice hockey players in Wales
Slovak expatriate ice hockey players in Germany